Johann Baer was a Germany revolutionary socialist.  He became a member of the Communist League. Following the Revolution of 1848 and 1849, he fled to London.  Baer lived in London throughout the early 1850s.  He was an associate of both Karl Marx and Frederick Engels.<ref>Biographical note contained in the Collected Works of Karl Marx and Frederick Engels: Volume 11 (International Publishers: New York, 1979) p. 692.</ref>

References

German socialists
German revolutionaries